This was the first edition of the men's singles tournament.

Peter Polansky won the title after Vincent Millot retired before the start of the third set in the final.

Seeds

Draw

Finals

Top half

Bottom half

References
Main Draw
Qualifying Draw

Challenger Banque Nationale de Gatineau
Challenger de Gatineau